The Zuwayya ( Al-Zuwayya) are  an independent Murabtin tribe, one of the major Arab Bedouin tribes of Cyrenaica and Fezzan, Libya.

Traditionally practicing nomadic pastoralism of sheep and camels in a triangular area with its apex at Ajdabiya, the Zuwayya conquered the richest oasis of the interior, Kufra, in 1840, subduing the  Toubou tribes. The Zuwayya tribe owns most of the date palm groves of the Kufra oases, employing the Toubou tribesmen as labourers.

The Zuwayya together with the Majabra tribe of Jalu converted to the Senussi order in the late 19th century, allowing the spread of this ideology into Wadai and Chad.

The Zuwayya tribe took part in the Libyan Civil War on the side of the opposition. 
The head of the tribe, Shaikh Faraj al Zuway, threatened to cut off Libyan oil exports unless the Gaddafi government stopped the "suppression of protestors".

References

Ali Abdullatif Ahmida, The making of modern Libya: state formation, colonization, and resistance, SUNY Press, 2009, pp. 82–83.

Bedouins in Libya
Bedouin groups
Tribes of Libya
Kufra District
Cyrenaica